Dodgson is a surname. Its origin is "son of Roger", "Dodge" being a mediaeval nickname for Roger, as were Rodge and Hodge.
Campbell Dodgson (1867–1948), British art historian and museum curator
Catharine Dodgson (1883–1954), British artist
Charles Dodgson (bishop) (c.1722–1795), Anglican Bishop of Elphin
Charles Dodgson (priest) (1800–1868), Anglican Archdeacon of Richmond
Charles Lutwidge Dodgson, English mathematician, logician, clergyman, photographer and author, better known by his pen name of Lewis Carroll.
Edwin Heron Dodgson, youngest brother of the above, Church of England clergyman and missionary
Elyse Dodgson (1945–2018), British theatre producer
Lewis Dodgson, a fictional minor character in the novel Jurassic Park
Mark Dodgson (born 1957), Australian academic and author
Neil Dodgson (born 1966), British computer scientist
Stephen Dodgson (1924–2013), British composer

Dodgson is also a given name, following the practice of using an ancestor's surname as a child's given name.

Dodgson Hamilton Madden, Irish Unionist Member of Parliament (1887-92)
George Dodgson Callow (1829–1875), English painter
John Dodgson Barrow, American landscape painter

See also
Dodgson condensation, mathematical method named after its inventor, Charles Lutwidge Dodgson.

English-language surnames
Surnames of English origin
Patronymic surnames
Surnames from given names